Marlene Elejarde Díaz (June 3, 1951 in Havana – April 29, 1989) was a sprinter from Cuba. At the 1968 Summer Olympics she helped win a silver medal in 4 x 100 metres relay, the first Olympic medal ever won by Cuban women. At the 1972 Summer Olympics she won another relay medal, this time a bronze. She died in a car accident in 1989.

References
 
 

1951 births
1989 deaths
Cuban female sprinters
Olympic athletes of Cuba
Olympic silver medalists for Cuba
Olympic bronze medalists for Cuba
Athletes (track and field) at the 1968 Summer Olympics
Athletes (track and field) at the 1972 Summer Olympics
Road incident deaths in Cuba
Athletes from Havana
Medalists at the 1968 Summer Olympics
Medalists at the 1972 Summer Olympics
Olympic silver medalists in athletics (track and field)
Olympic bronze medalists in athletics (track and field)
Athletes (track and field) at the 1971 Pan American Games
Athletes (track and field) at the 1975 Pan American Games
Pan American Games bronze medalists for Cuba
Pan American Games silver medalists for Cuba
Pan American Games medalists in athletics (track and field)
Central American and Caribbean Games gold medalists for Cuba
Competitors at the 1970 Central American and Caribbean Games
Competitors at the 1974 Central American and Caribbean Games
Central American and Caribbean Games medalists in athletics
Medalists at the 1971 Pan American Games
Medalists at the 1975 Pan American Games
Olympic female sprinters
20th-century Cuban women
20th-century Cuban people